Saint Victor of Arcis (Vittre, Vitre, Victor the Hermit; f. 7th century) was a 6th- or 7th-century hermit and then monk in Champagne, France, known from the writings in his honor by Saint Bernard. His feast day is 26 February.

Monks of Ramsgate account

The monks of St Augustine's Abbey, Ramsgate wrote in their Book of Saints (1921),

Butler's account

The hagiographer Alban Butler (1710–1773) wrote in his Lives of the Fathers, Martyrs, and Other Principal Saints under February 26,

Ranbeck's account

Ægidius Ranbeck (1608–1692) wrote in his Heiliges Benedictiner-Jahr (Saints of the Order of Saint Benedict; 1677),,

Notes

Sources

 
 
 

7th-century Frankish saints
7th-century deaths